Anthony Derricks (born December 17, 1976) is a former Arena Football League defensive specialist/k.o. returner stand-out who played most recently for the Los Angeles Avengers. He holds Arena football records for kickoff returns in a game (11), return yards in a game (336) and touchdowns on returns in a game (4). His 25.1 average per return on kickoffs for the 2000 season is also a record. He finished second in the 2000 rookie of the year balloting.

College years
Derricks attended Mississippi State University from 1995 to 1999 and was a four-year letterman in football. His last college game was in the 1999 Cotton Bowl against the University of Texas Longhorns and the Heisman winning running back, Ricky Williams.

References

External links

Stats at ArenaFan

1976 births
Living people
People from Forest, Mississippi
American football defensive backs
Mississippi State Bulldogs football players
New England Sea Wolves players
Toronto Phantoms players
Chicago Rush players
Colorado Crush players
Indiana Firebirds players
Tampa Bay Storm players
Los Angeles Avengers players